Isabel is an unincorporated community in Embarrass Township, Edgar County, Illinois, United States.

Notable person
Isabel was the birthplace of Lester C. Hunt, 19th Governor of Wyoming.

Geography
It is less than a mile west of the small town of Borton.

References

Unincorporated communities in Edgar County, Illinois
Unincorporated communities in Illinois